Coaches of the Big 12 Conference bestow the following individual awards at the end of each football season.

Offensive Player of the Year
 1996: Troy Davis, RB, Iowa State
 1997: Ricky Williams, RB, Texas
 1998: Ricky Williams, RB, Texas
 1999: Major Applewhite, QB, Texas and Eric Crouch, QB, Nebraska
 2000: Josh Heupel, QB, Oklahoma
 2001: Eric Crouch, QB, Nebraska
 2002: Chris Brown, RB, Colorado
 2003: Jason White, QB, Oklahoma
 2004: Jason White, QB, Oklahoma
 2005: Vince Young, QB, Texas
 2006: Zac Taylor, QB, Nebraska
 2007: Chase Daniel, QB, Missouri
 2008: Sam Bradford, QB, Oklahoma
 2009: Colt McCoy, QB, Texas
 2010: Justin Blackmon, WR, Oklahoma State
 2011: Robert Griffin III, QB, Baylor
 2012: Collin Klein, QB, Kansas State
 2013: Bryce Petty, QB, Baylor
 2014: Trevone Boykin, QB, TCU
 2015: Baker Mayfield, QB, Oklahoma
 2016: Dede Westbrook, WR, Oklahoma
 2017: Baker Mayfield, QB, Oklahoma
 2018: Kyler Murray, QB, Oklahoma
 2019: Chuba Hubbard, RB, Oklahoma State
 2020: Breece Hall, RB, Iowa State
 2021: Breece Hall, RB, Iowa State
 2022: Max Duggan, QB, TCU

Defensive Player of the Year
 1996: Grant Wistrom, DE, Nebraska
 1997: Grant Wistrom, DE, Nebraska
 1998: Dat Nguyen, LB, Texas A&M
 1999: Mark Simoneau, LB, Kansas State
 2000: Casey Hampton, DL, Texas (Coaches), Rocky Calmus, LB, Oklahoma 
 2001: Roy Williams, DB, Oklahoma
 2002: Terence Newman, DB, Kansas State
 2003: Teddy Lehman, LB, Oklahoma
 2004: Derrick Johnson, LB, Texas
 2005: Nick Reid, LB, Kansas and Dwayne Slay (AP) DB, Texas Tech
 2006: Rufus Alexander, LB, Oklahoma and Aaron Ross, DB, Texas
 2007: Jordon Dizon, LB, Colorado and Curtis Lofton LB Oklahoma
 2008: Brian Orakpo, DL, Texas
 2009: Ndamukong Suh, DL, Nebraska
 2010: Prince Amukamara, DB, Nebraska
 2011: A. J. Klein, LB, Iowa State and Frank Alexander, DE, Oklahoma
 2012: Arthur Brown, LB, Kansas State
 2013: Jackson Jeffcoat, DE, Texas and Jason Verrett, CB, TCU
 2014: Paul Dawson, LB, TCU
 2015: Andrew Billings, DT, Baylor and Emmanuel Ogbah, DE, Oklahoma State
 2016: Jordan Willis, DE, Kansas State
 2017: Ogbonnia Okoronkwo, DE/LB, Oklahoma  and Malik Jefferson, LB, Texas 
 2018: David Long Jr., LB, West Virginia
 2019: James Lynch, DL, Baylor
 2020: Mike Rose, LB, Iowa State
 2021: Jalen Pitre, DB, Baylor
 2022: Felix Anudike-Uzomah, DE, Kansas State

Special Teams Player of the Year
 2005: Mason Crosby, PK, Colorado
 2006: Daniel Sepulveda, PK, Baylor
 2007: Marcus Herford, KR, Kansas
 2008: Dez Bryant, PR/KR, Oklahoma State
 2009: Brandon Banks, PR/KR, Kansas State
 2010: Dan Bailey, PK, Oklahoma State
 2011: Quinn Sharp, PK/P, Oklahoma State
 2012: Quinn Sharp, PK/P, Oklahoma State and Tavon Austin, KR/PR, West Virginia
 2013: Tyler Lockett, KR, Kansas State
 2014: Tyler Lockett, KR, Kansas State
 2015: Morgan Burns, KR/PR, Kansas State
 2016: Michael Dickson, P, Texas
 2017: Michael Dickson, P, Texas
 2018: Austin Seibert, K/P, Oklahoma
 2019: Joshua Youngblood, KR, Kansas State
 2020: Trestan Ebner, KR/PR, Baylor
 2021: Trestan Ebner, KR/PR, Baylor
 2022: Derius Davis, KR/PR, TCU

Offensive Newcomer of the Year
 1996: Scott Frost, QB, Nebraska
 1997: Michael Bishop, QB, Kansas State
 1998: Mike Moschetti, QB, Colorado
 1999: Josh Heupel, QB, Oklahoma
 2000: Robert Ferguson, WR, Texas A&M
 2001: Seneca Wallace, QB, Iowa State
 2002: Bill Whittemore, QB, Kansas
 2003: Joe Vaughn, C, Kansas
 2004: Adrian Peterson, RB, Oklahoma
 2005: Robert Johnson, WR, Texas Tech
 2006: Adarius Bowman, WR, Oklahoma State
 2007: Deon Murphy, WR, Kansas State
 2008: Brandon Banks, WR, Kansas State
 2009: Daniel Thomas, RB, Kansas State
 2010: None
 2011: Aaron Horne, WR, Iowa State
 2012: Lache Seastrunk, RB, Baylor
 2013: Charles Sims, RB, West Virginia
 2014: Tyreek Hill, RB, Oklahoma State
 2015: Dede Westbrook, WR, Oklahoma
 2016: Justin Crawford, RB, West Virginia
 2017: Will Grier, QB, West Virginia
 2018: Jalen Hurd, WR, Baylor
 2019: Jalen Hurts, QB, Oklahoma
 2020: Xavier Hutchinson, WR, Iowa State
 2021: Jaylen Warren, RB, Oklahoma State
 2022: Dillon Gabriel, QB, Oklahoma

Defensive Newcomer of the Year
 1996: Gana Joseph, DB, Oklahoma
 1997: Jeff Kelly, LB, Kansas State
 1998: Jess Beckom, LB, Iowa State
 1999: Mario Fatafehi, DL, Kansas State
 2000: Derrick Yates, DB, Kansas State
 2001: Tank Reese, DL, Kansas State
 2002: Lance Mitchell, LB, Oklahoma
 2003: Donte Nicholson, DB, Oklahoma
 2004: Tim Dobbins, LB, Iowa State
 2005: C. J. Ah You, DL, Oklahoma
 2006: Misi Tupe, LB, Texas A&M
 2007: Gary Chandler, DB, Kansas State
 2008: McKinner Dixon, DE, Texas Tech
 2009: David Sims, DB, Iowa State
 2010: Lavonte David, LB, Nebraska
 2011: Arthur Brown, LB, Kansas State
 2012: Calvin Barnett, DT, Oklahoma State
 2013: Isaiah Johnson, S, Kansas
 2014: Shaq Riddick, DE, West Virginia
 2015: Demond Tucker, DL, Iowa State
 2016: D. J. Reed, DB, Kansas State
 2017: Ben Banogu, DE, TCU
 2018: Greg Eisworth, DB, Iowa State
 2019: LaRon Stokes, DL, Oklahoma
 2020: Tony Fields II, LB, West Virginia
 2021: Siaki Ika, DL, Baylor
 2022: Johnny Hodges, LB, TCU

Offensive Freshman of the Year
 1996: De'mond Parker, RB, Oklahoma
 1997: Tony Lindsay, QB, Oklahoma State
 1998: Major Applewhite, QB, Texas
 1999: Shaud Williams, RB, Texas Tech
 2000: Roy Williams, WR, Texas
 2001: Cedric Benson, RB, Texas
 2002: Brad Smith, QB, Missouri
 2003: Vince Young, QB, Texas
 2004: Adrian Peterson, RB, Oklahoma
 2005: Jamaal Charles, RB, Texas
 2006: Colt McCoy, QB, Texas
 2007: Michael Crabtree, WR, Texas Tech and Jeremy Maclin, WR, Missouri
 2008: Robert Griffin III, QB, Baylor
 2009: Christine Michael, RB, Texas A&M
 2010: Taylor Martinez, QB, Nebraska
 2011: Tyler Lockett, WR/KR, Kansas State
 2012: J. W. Walsh, QB, Oklahoma State
 2013: Baker Mayfield, QB, Texas Tech
 2014: Samaje Perine, RB, Oklahoma
 2015: Mike Warren, RB, Iowa State
 2016: Justice Hill, RB, Oklahoma State
 2017: Charlie Brewer, QB, Baylor and Jalen Reagor, WR, TCU
 2018: Pooka Williams Jr., RB, Kansas
 2019: Spencer Sanders, QB, Oklahoma State
 2020: Deuce Vaughn, RB, Kansas State
 2021: Xavier Worthy, WR, Texas
 2022: Richard Reese, RB, Baylor

Defensive Freshman of the Year
 1996: Mark Simoneau, LB, Kansas State
 1997: Ben Kelly, DB, Colorado
 1998: Justin Smith, DE, Missouri
 1999: Cory Redding, DL, Texas
 2000: Terry Pierce, LB, Kansas State
 2001: Tommie Harris, DL, Oklahoma and Derrick Johnson, LB, Texas
 2002: Rodrique Wright, DL, Texas
 2003: Jason Berryman, DL, Iowa State
 2004: Jordon Dizon, LB, Colorado
 2005: Brian Orakpo, DL, Texas
 2006: Andre Sexton, S, Oklahoma State
 2007: Gerald McCoy, DT, Oklahoma
 2008: Travis Lewis, LB, Oklahoma
 2009: Aldon Smith, DE, Missouri
 2010: Tony Jefferson, DB, Oklahoma and Shaun Lewis, LB, Oklahoma State
 2011: Quandre Diggs, DB, Texas
 2012: Devonte Fields, DE, TCU
 2013: Dominique Alexander, LB, Oklahoma
 2014: Kamari Cotton-Moya, DB, Iowa State
 2015: Malik Jefferson, LB, Texas
 2016: Reggie Walker, DE, Kansas State
 2017: Kenneth Murray, LB, Oklahoma and Ross Blacklock, DT, TCU
 2018: Caden Sterns, DB, Texas
 2019: Ar'Darius Washington, DB, TCU
 2020: Isheem Young, S, Iowa State and Khari Coleman, DL, TCU
 2021: Collin Oliver, DE, Oklahoma State
 2022: Kendal Daniels, S, Oklahoma State

Offensive Lineman of the Year
 2006: Justin Blalock, Texas
 2007: Adam Spieker, Missouri and Cody Wallace, Texas A&M
 2008: Jon Cooper, Oklahoma
 2009: Russell Okung, Oklahoma State
 2010: Nate Solder, Colorado
 2011: Grant Garner, Oklahoma State
 2012: Cyril Richardson, Baylor
 2013: Cyril Richardson, Baylor
 2014: Spencer Drango, Baylor and B. J. Finney, Kansas State
 2015: Spencer Drango, Baylor
 2016: Orlando Brown Jr., Oklahoma
 2017: Orlando Brown Jr., Oklahoma
 2018: Dalton Risner, Kansas State and Dru Samia, Oklahoma and Yodny Cajuste, West Virginia
 2019: Creed Humphrey, Oklahoma and Colton McKivitz, West Virginia
 2020: Creed Humphrey, Oklahoma
 2021: Connor Galvin, Baylor
 2022: Cooper Beebe, Kansas State

Defensive Lineman of the Year
 2006: Adam Carriker, Nebraska
 2007: James McClinton, Kansas
 2008: Brian Orakpo, Texas
 2009: Ndamukong Suh, Nebraska
 2010: Jeremy Beal, Oklahoma
 2011: Frank Alexander, Oklahoma
 2012: Meshak Williams, Kansas State
 2013: Ryan Mueller, Kansas State
 2014: Emmanuel Ogbah, Oklahoma State
 2015: Andrew Billings, Baylor
 2016: Jordan Willis, Kansas State
 2017: Poona Ford, Texas
 2018: Charles Omenihu, Texas
 2019: James Lynch, Baylor
 2020: Darius Stills, West Virginia
 2021: Will McDonald IV, Iowa State and Felix Anudike-Uzomah, Kansas State
 2022: Felix Anudike-Uzomah, Kansas State

Coach of the Year
 1996: Spike Dykes, Texas Tech
 1997: Bob Simmons, Oklahoma State
 1998: Bill Snyder, Kansas State
 1999: Frank Solich, Nebraska
 2000: Bob Stoops, Oklahoma
 2001: Frank Solich, Nebraska
 2002: Bill Snyder, Kansas State
 2003: Bob Stoops, Oklahoma
 2004: Dan McCarney, Iowa State
 2005: Mack Brown, Texas
 2006: Bob Stoops, Oklahoma
 2007: Mark Mangino, Kansas
 2008: Mike Leach, Texas Tech and Bob Stoops, Oklahoma
 2009: Mack Brown, Texas
 2010: Mike Gundy, Oklahoma State
 2011: Bill Snyder, Kansas State
 2012: Bill Snyder, Kansas State
 2013: Art Briles, Baylor
 2014: Gary Patterson, TCU
 2015: Bob Stoops, Oklahoma
 2016: Bob Stoops, Oklahoma
 2017: Matt Campbell, Iowa State
 2018: Matt Campbell, Iowa State and Lincoln Riley, Oklahoma
 2019: Matt Rhule, Baylor
 2020: Matt Campbell, Iowa State
 2021: Mike Gundy, Oklahoma State
 2022: Sonny Dykes, TCU

External links

Official Big 12 announcements
 2004 SBC Big 12 All-Conference Football Awards Announced
 2005 SBC All-Big 12 Conference Football Awards Announced
 2006 AT&T All-Big 12 Football Awards Announced
 2007 All-Big 12 Football Awards Announced
 2008 All-Big 12 Football Awards Announced
 2009 All-Big 12 Football Awards Announced
 2010 All-Big 12 Football Awards Announced
 2011 All-Big 12 Football Awards Announced
 2012 Football All-Big 12 Awards Announcement
 2013 Football All-Big 12 Awards Announcement
 2014 Football All-Big 12 Awards Announcement
 2015 Football All-Big 12 Awards Announcement
 2016 Football All-Big 12 Awards Announcement
 2017 Football All-Big 12 Awards Announcement
 2018 Football All-Big 12 Awards Announcement
 2019 Football All-Big 12 Awards Announcement
2020 Football All-Big 12 Awards Announcement
2021 Football All-Big 12 Awards Announcement

College football conference awards and honors
Individual Awards